James Sanderson may refer to:

 James Sanderson (musician) (1769–c. 1841), English violinist and composer
 James Sanderson (naval officer) (1926–2010), U.S. Navy admiral
 Sir James Sanderson, 1st Baronet (1741–1798), British banker and politician
 James Sanderson (swimmer) (born 1993), Gibraltarian swimmer
 James Sanderson (rugby union) (1852–1930), Scottish rugby union player
 James Sanderson (military surgeon) (1812–1891), military surgeon in India and amateur meteorologist
 James Sanderson (curler), Scottish curler